Erica Deeman is a visual artist. She was born in the UK in 1977 and is living in America. Her artwork's subject matter is related to Blacks' gender, race, and identity. Deeman focuses on all aspects of the history of Black culture and its experiences during history. In addition, she combines these with her own experiences and ancestral legacies.

Deeman is a British photographer and contemporary artist who lives and works in San Francisco, California, and Seattle, Washington. She is known for her series of portrait photography which depicts and explores the identity, race, and gender of men and women from the African Diaspora.

Works

Silhouettes 
Deeman's exhibition at Berkeley Art Museum Pacific Film Archive is 30 silhouette Black women's portraits which are photographs. She celebrates the Black female form which brings the question about the context. These silhouettes are not just a perspective, a profile, or an angle. They speak about a history of beauty and portraiture which is related to nobility. These photographs are large, and Deeman created them when she was a student at the Academy of Art University. Deeman explains that she used non-model women for this project. She was waiting outside of her studio in San Francisco and looking for Black women whom she thought were from the African Diaspora.

Self Portraits 
She speaks about her work and her experience as a photographer. She says that she did not think about taking a photo of herself like a self-portrait project. However, she enjoys making projects that are about the portrait. She put a lot of time, care, and energy to make portraits of people, and she could not think to put all of that for herself. When she came to America, her interest to see herself began. She was starting to wonder about her changes since she came to America. It was time for her to make a self-portrait of herself. During this process the outbreak of COVID-19 began so work with others was limited. She had herself to collaborate, and her portrait series happened.

Brown 
In the group show, "Sense of Self," she, like other artists, manifests aspects of herself in photographs that are not conventionally self-portraits. For instance, Marcela Pardo Ariza and Jamil Hellu positioned themselves in a group portrait.

Deenan, in her series "Brown," 2015–16, which is the portrait of men from the African diaspora in a brown background lighted skillfully photographed and edited to indicate the layers of colors in skin tone and "expectations of objectivity and self-revelation in portraiture" using the medium of photography.

Exhibition 

 Old Truman Brewery, London, UK
 Pier 24 Photography, San Francisco, California
 Berkeley Art Museum, Berkeley, California
 New Orleans Museum of Art, New Orleans, Louisiana

Permanent collections 
 Berkeley Art Museum and Pacific Film Archive, Berkeley, California
 Museum of Contemporary Photography, Chicago, Illinois
 Museum of Photographic Arts, San Diego, California
 New Orleans Museum of Art, New Orleans, Louisiana
 Pérez Art Museum Miami, Miami, Florida
 Pier 24 Photography, San Francisco, California

Education 
2020: UC Berkeley, Berkeley, California: MFA Candidate Art Practice

2000: Leeds Beckett University, Leeds, UK: BA (Hons) Public Relations.

2013: Academy of Art University, the UC Berkeley Art Museum and Pacific Film Archive (BAMPFA).

2014: Academy of Art, San Francisco, California: BFA Photography.

References 

1977 births
Living people
British women photographers
21st-century British photographers